The following is a list of episodes from Talkshow with Spike Feresten, an American late-night talk show hosted by Spike Feresten on Fox.

Episodes

Season 1 (2006–07)

Season 2 (2007–08)

Season 3 (2008–09)

References

External links
 

Lists of American comedy television series episodes